The Roseville Pottery Company was an American art pottery manufacturer in the 19th and 20th centuries. Along with Rookwood Pottery and Weller Pottery, it was one of the three major art potteries located in Ohio around the turn of the 20th century. Though the company originally made simple household pieces, the Arts and Crafts–inspired designs proved popular, and Roseville pieces are now sought after by collectors.

History

The company was founded by J.F. Weaver in Roseville, Ohio, in 1890. It was incorporated in 1892 with George Young, a former Roseville salesman, as secretary and general manager. Under the direction of Young, the Roseville company had great success producing stoneware flower pots and other practical household items. In 1895, the company expanded by purchasing Midland Pottery, and by 1896 George Young had amassed a controlling interest in Roseville Pottery. In 1898, they purchased the Clark Stoneware Company in Zanesville, and moved the headquarters there.   

In 1900 Young hired Ross C. Purdy to create the company's first art pottery line, named Rozane (a contraction of "Roseville" and "Zanesville"). The Rozane line was designed to compete against Rookwood Pottery's Standard Glaze, Owens Pottery's Utopian, and Weller Pottery's Louwelsa art lines. By 1901, the company owned and operated four plants and employed 325 people. 

Frederick Hurten Rhead was the art director of Roseville between 1904 and 1909.  He is associated with the Della Robbia line, and he designed or oversaw the Juvenile, Donatello, Mostique and Pauleo lines. Frederick's brother Harry Rhead stayed on at Weller after Frederick left.

Frank Ferrell became the art director for Roseville in 1917 and was responsible for creating many popular Roseville designs. Among Roseville's most popular designs are Blackberry, Sunflower, and Pinecone. 

The Roseville Pottery Company produced its final designs in 1953, and the following year their facilities were bought by the Mosaic Tile Company.

In 2017, a company named The Kings Fortune of Fishers, Indiana, was granted trademarks by the U.S. Patent Office for both Roseville and Roseville Pottery. Marina Bosetti, a  ceramic artist in Raleigh, North Carolina, has been contracted to produce limited-edition tiles in the Art Nouveau style for the company.

Collectors
Since the company closed in the 1950s, Roseville pottery has seen two distinct revivals: one with baby boomers in the 1970s, and again in the late 1990s and early 2000s during the Mission Style revival. 

Today, many Roseville styles remain relatively common while rare pieces can fetch hundreds or even thousands of dollars. Because Roseville's designs were so influential, replicas and counterfeits are common, and the wide variety of kiln markings—or the lack thereof—on genuine pieces can be confusing for collectors.

Patterns and Lines

References

Roseville Pottery for Love or Money. By: Virginia Hillway Buxton. 1st edition 1977, 2nd edition 1996.

Further reading

External links
Official Roseville Pottery website
Roseville Art Pottery
Just Art Pottery Roseville Pattern Guide

Arts and Crafts movement
Muskingum County, Ohio
Perry County, Ohio
American art pottery